Berlin-Lichterfelde West (in German Bahnhof Berlin-Lichterfelde West) is a railway station in Lichterfelde West, within the district of Lichterfelde (Steglitz-Zehlendorf) in Berlin, Germany. It is served by the Berlin S-Bahn and several local bus lines.

The station was built in 1872 in the style of a Tuscan villa as a train station for the elegant development of Villenkolonie Lichterfelde West, a newly created expensive residential area for wealthy Berliners.

From 1946 until 1993 Lichterfelde West was the terminus of the Duty-Train of the United States Forces in Berlin.

References

External links
Station information 

Berlin S-Bahn stations
Buildings and structures in Steglitz-Zehlendorf
Railway stations in Germany opened in 1872